Hardtner may refer to:

Hardtner, Kansas, a city in Kansas, United States
Henry E. Hardtner (1870–1935), American businessman and conservationist